Palla may refer to:

 Palla (garment), a women's headcloth or shawl from ancient Rome
 Palla (butterfly), a brush-footed butterfly genus described by Jacob Hübner in 1819
 Palla (troubadour), a twelfth-century minstrel from Galicia
 Palla, North 24 Parganas, village in West Bengal, India
 Palla, a tortrix moth genus invalidly described by Gustaf Johan Billberg in 1820, nowadays considered a junior synonym of Pammene
 Palla (fish), see Ilish
 Palla (surname), a surname
 Palla (game), a ball game from Tuscany (Italy)

See also
 Pall (disambiguation)
 Pallium, an ecclesiastical vestment in the Roman Catholic Church